Cavendish Avenue is a street in St John's Wood, London, England.

Cavendish Avenue runs north to south from Circus Road to Wellington Place, and is parallel to Wellington Road to the west. At its southern end lie the grounds of Lord's Cricket Ground.

Number 7 has been Paul McCartney's London home since he bought it in April 1965 for £40,000, from Desmond O'Neill, a doctor. It lies close to Abbey Road Studios.

References

Streets in the City of Westminster
St John's Wood